We'wha (1849–1896, various spellings) was a Zuni Native American from New Mexico, a notable fiber artist, weaver and potter. As the most famous lhamana on record, We'wha served as a cultural ambassador for Native Americans in general, and the Zuni in particular, serving as a contact point and educator for many European-American settlers, teachers, soldiers, missionaries, and anthropologists. In 1886, We'wha was part of the Zuni delegation to Washington, D.C.; during that visit, We'wha met President Grover Cleveland.

In traditional Zuni culture, the lhamana are male-bodied people who take on the social and ceremonial roles usually performed by women in their culture, at least some of the time. They wear a mixture of women's and men's clothing and much of their work is in the areas usually occupied by Zuni women. They are also known to serve as mediators. Some contemporary lhamana participate in the modern, pan-Indian two-spirit community.

We'wha's friendship with anthropologist Matilda Coxe Stevenson would lead to much material on the Zuni being published. Stevenson wrote down her observations of We'wha, using both male and female pronouns at different points in time, writing, "She performs masculine religious and judicial functions at the same time that she performs feminine duties, tending to laundry and the garden". "He was the most intelligent person in the pueblo. Strong character made his word law among both men and women with whom he associated. Though his wrath was dreaded by men as well as women, he was loved by all children, to whom he was ever kind." We'wha lived for part of their life in the role and dress usually associated with men in Zuni culture, and part of their life in roles associated with women. Friends and relatives have used both male and female pronouns for Whe'wha.

Early life
We'wha was born in 1849 in New Mexico as a member of the Zuni people. The Zuni tribe at this time was still free to practice their religious customs and ceremonies. The year of We'wha's birth was the first year the Zuni had interactions with the Americans, and they initially agreed to ally with the colonists in some territorial battles against their traditional rivals the Navajo and Apache. The colonists brought smallpox to the village and in 1853 both of We'wha's parents died from the new illness. We'wha and his brother were then adopted by their aunt on their father's side. We'wha remained a member of her mother's tribal clan known as the donashi:kwe (the Badger People). He also retained ceremonial ties to his father's clan, bichi:kwe (the Dogwood People). The new adoptive arrangement also added two foster sisters and a brother.

Zuni children could be recognized as lhamana, from as early as three or four. However, in We'wha's case, We'wha was first included in religious ceremonies for Zuni boys at the age of twelve. It was not until a few years after this that the tribe recognized We'wha's lhamana traits and their religious training was then handed over to female relatives. We'wha then learned the skills of the Zuni women – grinding and making corn meal, making ceremonial pottery, cooking, and various domestic tasks. In 1864, the Zunis and the American troops won a victory over the Navajo, and the Navajo were then sent out to a reservation in New Mexico for four years. Some members of We'wha's tribe then moved into the abandoned Zuni lands of Nutria and Pescado, and became farmers, including We'wha and their adoptive family. There We'wha held the occupation of a farmer, meaning that they were holding what was considered a traditionally male occupation in Zuni culture while their family lived in this area.

Adult life

In the 1870s We'wha was still living and working on the farm. As We'wha's adoptive mother began to get older, We'wha took on more of the household duties, as did his adopted older sister. In 1877 Protestant missionaries began to arrive among the Zuni tribe. These missionaries were part of the "Peace Policy of Grant Administration". The policy was for Native Americans, instead of being moved onto reservations, to be assimilated into American society by indoctrination into Christianity. These Protestant missionaries were the first white people to live among their particular Zuni tribe and were likely the first white people that We'wha had encountered. At this point, We'wha would have been in their thirties.

The Presbyterian Minister and medical doctor assigned to We'wha's tribe was a man named Taylor F. Ealy. He came to the village with his wife, two daughters, and an assistant teacher on October 12, 1878. They were assigned to a school built there the year before. We'wha helped Mrs. Ealy care for her two small daughters, along with various teaching responsibilities and housework. Mrs. Ealy's diary included pages talking about We'wha: "We made in all this week five garments; a skirt and two basques for We-Wa, a dress for Grace (a Zuni), a dress and skirt for her sister, besides one for which they found the calico." That diary entry is dated January 29, 1881. It is possible We'wha received payment for their work with the Ealys. It would not have been in the form of currency, rather goods similar to the clothes they made together. In 1881 the Protestant missionaries began to depart the village including the Ealy family. The mission had changed the religious mindset of the Zuni very little and the impact the school had was minimal. The school remained there but had little impact until it was revitalized in 1888.

We'wha's and Stevenson's friendship

Matilda Coxe Stevenson and We'wha met each other in 1879, while they were working with Mrs. Ealy. Stevenson wrote that We'wha was very friendly to outsiders and willing to learn English. We'wha was described by Stevenson as "the most intelligent person in the pueblo. Strong character made his word law among both men and women with whom he associated. Though his wrath was dreaded by men as well as women, he was loved by all children, to whom he was ever kind". By learning English, We'wha was able to interact well with white visitors, and this helped them build a friendship with Mrs. Stevenson. We'wha was visited by Stevenson in 1881, 1884, 1886, 1891–92, 1895 and 1896. These visits encouraged the cultivation of their friendship.

In 1879, Stevenson introduced commercial laundry soap to We'wha's village (Southwestern tribes already had herbal soaps). She taught them how to wash clothes using this stronger, chemical soap and soon We'wha began washing quantities of clothes for the members of the Protestant mission, earning silver dollars for this service. We'wha then decided to move to Fort Wingate and wash for the soldiers as well as the captain's family. We'wha began to extend the business past the fort, and wash for white settlers as well. Few Zuni people worked for white people for pay. If they did work for pay, "the men wearing female attire being preferred to the women on account of their strength and endurance".

Stevenson refers to her friend We'wha as "he" and at other times as "she", seeming to have made a choice for the latter sometime after 1904, writing in her diary, "As the writer could never think of her faithful and devoted friend in any other light, she will continue to use the feminine gender when referring to We'wha".
 
We'wha was hired by Stevenson to make Zuni religious pottery that would later be displayed in the National Museum  in Washington, D.C.. We'wha was a very accomplished potter, and followed the strict religious protocols that went with making Zuni pottery. As a talented weaver, We'wha also created baskets, dresses, blankets, and sashes. It was said that We'wha had an eye for likable patterns and colors. George Wharton James, an expert on Native American weaving styles wrote, "She was an expert weaver, and her pole of soft stuff was laden with the work of her loom-blankets and dresses exquisitely woven, and with a delicate perception of colour-values that delighted the eye of the connoisseur".

Later life

After We'wha returned to the pueblo community, serious conflicts broke out between the Zuni and the U.S. government.  We'wha was arrested along with five other Zuni leaders, accused of witchcraft, and served a month in prison. In 1896, We'wha died from heart failure, shortly after participating in the annual Sha'lako festival.

Legacy

We'wha appeared in a Google Doodle on November 1, 2021, which included some details of their life and legacy, along with a weaving game to help learn about Zuni weaving.

See also
List of people with non-binary gender identities

References

Sources

 Reprinted in 2010:

External links

1849 births
1896 deaths
Pueblo artists
Two-spirit people
Zuni people
People convicted of witchcraft